A double-decker tram or double-deck tram is a tram that has two levels or decks. Some double-decker trams have open tops. Double-deck trams were once popular in some European cities, like Berlin and London, throughout the British Empire countries in the early half of the 20th century including Auckland, Christchurch and Wellington in New Zealand; Hobart, Tasmania in Australia and in parts of Asia. They are still in service or even newly introduced in Hong Kong, Alexandria, Dubai, Oranjestad, Blackpool, Birkenhead, Franschhoek, Auckland and Douglas, mostly as heritage or tourist trams.

History

Heyday
The earliest double-deck trams were horse-drawn. The first electric double-deck trams were those built for the Blackpool Tramway in 1885, where Conduit tramcar No. 4 is the sole survivor of its class and is preserved at the National Tramway Museum in Crich, UK. They were common in the United Kingdom until the 1950s. London Transport was a heavy user of double-deck trams until the system closed in 1952. Apart from the Blackpool tramway, the Glasgow Corporation Tramways was the last urban British tramway to close, in 1962. 

In the United States double-deck tramcars were used by the Pittsburgh Railways (streetcar / interurban) between 1913 and 1924, a rare use of such tramcars in the United States of America.

From 1910 to 1964 double-deck trams were in use in Mumbai, India (Brihanmumbai Electric Supply and Transport Undertaking). They were also in use in Johannesburg, South Africa, where trams were operational from 1906 to 1961.

Preservation
Several tramcars have been preserved at the UK's National Tramway Museum, Beamish Museum, Black Country Living Museum, East Anglia Transport Museum, Heaton Park Tramway, Seaton Tramway, Summerlee Museum and the Wirral Transport Museum, where the cars are still in operation. Some have been preserved at New Zealand's Ferrymead Museum in Christchurch and MOTAT Museum in Auckland, which operates restored Wellington double-deck tramcar No. 47, which operated in 1906 and also has Auckland double-deck tramcar No. 17 in storage. The Douglas Bay Horse Tramway on the Isle of Man, opened in 1876 and continuously operating since then (with the exception of WWII), still operates the only remaining horse-drawn double-deck tramway cars in the world, as a heritage tramway. Blackpool Tramway still operates several double-deckers on weekends, of which there are several Balloon Cars from the 1930s (some of them rebuilt later) and one Standard Car from the 1920s. Hong Kong Tramways operates a very frequent service (trams run approx. every two minutes) on three routes on a main line and a side line to Happy Valley, only served with double deckers built from the 1960s to 2018.

1960s
The last double-deck tram built in the UK was Blackpool "Jubilee" Class No. 762, which entered service in 1982. However, it was originally built in 1935 as Blackpool "Balloon" Class No. 251, later renumbered No. 714. Its rebuild as No. 762 gave it a longer body and its pointed ends were replaced with rectangular ones. It was the second and final rebuild of two Blackpool "Balloon" tramcars into "Jubilee" tramcars, following on from "Jubilee" Class No. 761. Unlike No. 761, "Jubilee" tramcar No. 762 retained its central doors as exits for improved passenger flow at stops. For these reasons, it was considered to be an entirely new tram and on this basis, when it was retired in 2011, it was gifted to the National Tramway Museum in Crich.

Recent cars 
A few of the tramcars in the Alexandria tram system in Egypt are double-deckers built by Kinki Sharyo and Fuji Heavy Industries in Japan in 1975-1995. However, they are unpowered trailers that are towed/pushed by a powered tram as a steering car in a three car train.

In 2012 a new tram service, solely operated with double-decker cars, was opened in Franschhoek, South Africa, as the Franschhoek Wine Tram. It serves as a tourist tram connecting several wineries on eight lines (all of them partly served with so-called "tram buses", the trams only operating as a backbone) and operates on the restored tracks of an old railway line, which was opened in 1904 and closed in the 1990s. The cars were built by DCD Rolling Stock, South Africa, for the opening in 2012, but modelled after a Blackpool car from the 1920s.

A service in Dubai, the Dubai Trolley with hydrogen-fuelled double-deck trams in vintage style with an open upper deck, built by US manufacturer TIG/m, was announced in 2009 and opened in 2015 on a single-track line of 1.1km with plans for further extension, but frequently suspended due to the heat and according to some sources finally closed by 2019, the tracks barred by poles, the depot used as a shopping center, and the only car on public display.

The same technology by the same manufacturer was used in the four cars (two single-deckers, two double-deckers) for the new Tram of Oranjestad, Aruba, which was opened in 2012/13, and operates a daily regular service on a single-track line of 1.9 km.

In 2009-2016 Hong Kong extended its fleet largely with new cars that were mainly based on the traditional exterior but showed new technological features, such as a VVVT drive and a full aluminum body.

Manufacturers
Blackpool Tramway - Standard tramcars and rebuilt English Electric tramcars
Brush Engineering Falcon Works
Dick, Kerr & Co.
English Electric and United Electric Car
Glasgow Corporation Tramways
Hong Kong Tramways
Rouse, Black and Son, Wellington, New Zealand

Gallery

See also
Bilevel rail car
Double-decker bus

References

External links
Franschhoek Wine Tram: https://winetram.co.za/
Manufacturer of hydrogen-powered trams in Aruba and Dubai: https://www.tig-m.com/
MOTAT tramway collection Auckland, New Zealand: https://www.motat.org.nz/collections/collection-themes/tramways/